Victor Raskin (born April 17, 1944) is a distinguished professor of linguistics at Purdue University. He is the author of Semantic Mechanisms of Humor and Ontological Semantics and founding editor (now editor-at-large) of Humor, the journal for the International Society for Humor Studies.

He is an  associate director and founding faculty member of CERIAS at Purdue University along with Gene Spafford and Mikhail Atallah.

Biography
Victor Raskin was born in Irbit, USSR (now Russian Federation) in 1944. He obtained a doctorate in linguistics from Moscow State University in 1970. He has been married to Marina Bergelson since 1965; his daughter Sarah was born in 1982. He and his wife emigrated from the U.S.S.R. to Israel in 1973, and have been Israeli citizens since 1973. They moved to the United States in 1978, became permanent residents of the United States in 1979, and became U.S. citizens in 1984.

Education
 1970: Ph.D. in Structural, Computational, and Mathematical Linguistics, Moscow State University, USSR
 1966: M.A./M.S. summa cum laude in Structural and Computational Linguistics, Moscow State University, USSR
 1964: B.A./B.S. in Structural and Computational Linguistics, Moscow State University, USSR

Experience
 1999–present     Editor-at-Large, HUMOR: International Journal of Humor Research
 1998–present     Charter Member, Internal Advisory Board, Center for Education and Research in Information Assurance and Security (CERIAS), Purdue University
 1994–present     PI- and VP-level consultant on natural language and information technology for research laboratories and businesses
 1980–present     Professor of English and Linguistics, Purdue University
 2000                President, International Society of Humor Research
 1995-99            Chair, Graduate Interdepartmental Program in Linguistics, Purdue University
 1987-99            Editor-in-Chief, HUMOR: International Journal of Humor Research
 1979-99            Chair, Interdepartmental Program in Linguistics, Purdue University
 1979-80            Associate Professor of English and Linguistics, Purdue University
 1978-79            Associate Professor of English, Purdue University
 1978                 Visiting Professor of Linguistics, University of Michigan
 1973-78            Senior Associate Professor of Russian and Philosophy, The Hebrew University of Jerusalem, Israel
 1973-78            Senior Associate Professor of Linguistics (half-time), Tel Aviv University, Israel
 1966-73            From Lecturer to Acting Associate Professor of Linguistics, Moscow State University
 1962-73            From Junior Assistant to Group Leader, Computational Linguistics Lab, Moscow State University

Major publications

Solely authored books
 K teorii yazykovykh podsistem /Towards a Theory of Linguistic Subsystems/ (420 pp.), Moscow University Press, 1971
 Semantic Mechanisms of Humor (302 pp.), Dordrecht - Boston - Lancaster: D. Reidel, 1985

Co-authored books
 Metody semanticheskogo issledovaniya ogranichennogo podyazyka /Methods of Semantic Investigation of a Restricted Sublanguage/ (414 pp.), Moscow University Press, 1971 (with B. Gorodetsky)
 Slovari slovosochetaniy i chastotnye slovari slov ogranichennogo podyazyka /Dictionaries of Word Combinations and Dictionaries of Words with Frequencies of a Restricted Sublanguage/ (538 pp.), Moscow University Press, 1972 (with B. Y. Gorodetsky, A. E. Kibrik, L. S. Logakhina, G. V., Maksimova, and E. S. Prytkov)
 200 zadach po yazykovedeniyu i matematike /200 Problems in Linguistics and Mathematics/ (252 pp.), Moscow University Press, 1972 (with Boris Gorodetsky)
 Produktivnoe slovoslozhenie v shugnanskom, vengerskom, saamskom, khinalugskom i lezginskom yazykakh: Rezultaty polevoy lingvistiki /Productive Word Compounding in Shugnan, Hungarian, Saami, Hinalug, and Lezghin: Field Linguistics Results (678 pp.). Moscow: Moscow University Press, 1974 (with Boris Gorodetsky—the book was confiscated and the run, apparently, destroyed after and because of Raskin's emigration in 1973).
 Language and Writing: Applications of Linguistics to Rhetoric and Composition (279 pp.), Norwood, NJ: Ablex, 1987 (with I. H. Weiser)
 Ontological Semantics (350 pp.). Cambridge, MA: MIT Press, 2004 (with Sergei Nirenburg).

Former students
 Christian F. Hempelmann
 Salvatore Attardo
 Sergei Nirenburg
 Dallin D. Oaks

References

 Curriculum Vitae
 CERIAS staff page
 Purdue Linguistics directory
 ISHS membership directory

External links
 Curriculum Vitae
 Hakia, inc (archive as at Feb 2014)
 Purdue University department of linguistics
 CERIAS at Purdue

1944 births
Living people
People from Irbit
Russian Jews
Soviet emigrants to Israel
Israeli emigrants to the United States
American people of Russian-Jewish descent
Jewish American scientists
Linguists from the United States
Moscow State University alumni
Purdue University faculty
Humor researchers
21st-century American Jews